Tim Davies may refer to:

 Tim Davies (artist) (born 1960), Welsh artist with the artist group Beca
 Tim Davies (musician), Australian composer, orchestrator and musician
 Tim Davies (pop art artist) (born 1959), British pop art artist
 Tim Davies (racing driver), British Formula 3000 racing driver
 Timothy Davies (runner) (born 1977), Welsh athlete 
 Tim Davies (journalist), Australian journalist and television presenter